The Communauté de communes du Pays Neufchâtelois  is a former intercommunality in the Seine-Maritime département of the Normandy region of north-western France. It was created on 1 January 1998. It was merged into the new Communauté de communes Bray-Eawy in January 2017.

Participants 
The Communauté de communes comprised the following 23 communes:

Auvilliers
Bouelles
Bully
Callengeville
Esclavelles
Fesques
Flamets-Frétils
Fresles
Graval
Lucy
Massy
Ménonval
Mesnières-en-Bray
Mortemer
Nesle-Hodeng
Neufchâtel-en-Bray
Neuville-Ferrières
Quièvrecourt
Saint-Germain-sur-Eaulne
Saint-Martin-l'Hortier
Saint-Saire
Sainte-Beuve-en-Rivière
Vatierville

See also
Communes of the Seine-Maritime department

References 

Pays Neufchatelois